Michael Edward Danahay is an American politician. He served as a Democratic member for the 33rd district of the Louisiana House of Representatives.

Danahay attended McNeese State University, where he earned a Bachelor of Business Administration degree. In 2008 he was elected for the 33rd district of the Louisiana House of Representatives. Danahay succeeded Ronnie Johns. He left office on May 15, 2018, on being elected as mayor of Sulphur, Louisiana.

References 

Living people
Place of birth missing (living people)
Year of birth missing (living people)
Democratic Party members of the Louisiana House of Representatives
21st-century American politicians
Mayors of places in Louisiana
McNeese State University alumni